The 2019 SWF Scottish Cup, known as the 2019 SSE Scottish Women's Cup for sponsorship reasons, is the national cup competition in Scottish women's football.

First round
Teams in Bold advanced to the second round. The number in brackets indicates the level on the Scottish women's league pyramid each team competes in the 2019 season. H&I indicates a team which plays in the Highlands & Islands League.

Source:

Second round
Teams in Bold advanced to the third round.

Sources:

Third round
Teams competing in the 2019 Scottish Women's Premier League enter in this round. Teams in Bold advanced to the fourth round.

Sources:

Fourth round
Teams in Bold advanced to the quarter-finals.

Sources:

Quarter-finals
Teams in Bold advanced to the semi-finals.

Sources:

Semi-finals
Teams in Bold advanced to the final.

Sources:

Final

References

Scottish Women's Cup
Scottish Women's Cup